"Humanity" is a song by Scorpions. It is the first single from their album, Humanity - Hour 1. Scorpions performed their new single, on 24 March 2007 at a special concert to celebrate the 50th anniversary of signing the Roman treaty, which became the basis for foundation of the European Union.

Its main theme throughout is of the future downfall of human civilization as we know it.

It has received good reception and brief, but high airplay on hard rock stations, but has been hampered by the Scorpions' reputation as a "classic rock" band.

The music video fits with the song's theme: the band is seen playing on a stage with a doomsday-like background, there are screens that show human suffering, like in the September 11 attacks.

In India, an alternative video was made, consisting of images shot by common people. The video was telecast on VH1 channel.  

Scorpions (band) songs
Songs written by Desmond Child
2007 singles
Songs written by Eric Bazilian
2007 songs
Songs written by Klaus Meine